Annick de Susini (born 17 May 1960) is a French former swimmer who competed in the 1976 Summer Olympics and in the 1980 Summer Olympics.

References

1960 births
Living people
French female breaststroke swimmers
Olympic swimmers of France
Swimmers at the 1976 Summer Olympics
Swimmers at the 1980 Summer Olympics
Mediterranean Games medalists in swimming
Mediterranean Games gold medalists for France
Swimmers at the 1979 Mediterranean Games